Joachim Holmboe Rønneberg (2 May 1851 – 16 September 1929) was a Norwegian wholesaler and politician of the Conservative Party.

Biography
He was mayor of Ålesund in 1896, deputy mayor 1893–1895 and 1897–1901, and deputy member of parliament 1889–1891. He was a member of the Rønneberg family, the leading family and largest employer of Ålesund. He entered the family firm Carl E. Rønneberg & Sønner in 1875, received power of procuration in 1884 and inherited the firm with his younger brother Carl in 1904. After his brother's death in 1912, he led the firm alone.

He was the grandfather of Joachim Rønneberg and also the great-grandfather of Joakim Lystad.

Honours
Knight First Class of the Order of St. Olav

References

Norwegian businesspeople
1851 births
1929 deaths
Joachim Holmboe